Drenovo is a village in the municipality of Čaška, North Macedonia.

Demographics
According to the 2021 census, the village had a total of 24 inhabitants. Ethnic groups in the village include:

Macedonians 15
Persons for whom data are taken from administrative sources 9

References

Villages in Čaška Municipality